Ann O'Leary is an American behavioral psychologist, associated with the Centers for Disease Control and Prevention in Atlanta, Georgia. She specializes in behavior associated with AIDS.  O'Leary received her PhD from Stanford University. In 2002, the American Psychological Association's Committee on Psychology and AIDS gave her their Distinguished Leader Award.

Books
.
.
.

.

References

External links
 

21st-century American psychologists
American women psychologists
Stanford University alumni
Year of birth missing (living people)
Living people
21st-century American women